Atuq Wachanan (Quechua atuq fox, wacha birth, to give birth, -na, -n suffixes, "where the fox is born", also spelled Atoc-Huachanan) is a  mountain in the Andes of Peru. It is located in the Huánuco Region, Yarowilca Province, Aparicio Pomares District.

References

Mountains of Peru
Mountains of Huánuco Region